Yeylaq Rural District is in the Central District of Kaleybar County, East Azerbaijan province, Iran. At the National Census of 2006, its population was 3,846 in 838 households. There were 2,883 inhabitants in 794 households at the following census of 2011. At the most recent census of 2016, the population of the rural district was 2,763 in 945 households. The largest of its 28 villages was Arabshah Khan, with 512 people.

References 

Kaleybar County

Rural Districts of East Azerbaijan Province

Populated places in East Azerbaijan Province

Populated places in Kaleybar County